Dimitrios Marmarinos (alternate spelling: Dimitris) (Greek: Δημήτρης Μαρμαρινός; born on May 14, 1976 in Chalkida, Greece) is a Greek former professional basketball player. At a height of 2.07 m (6'9 ") tall, he played at the power forward and center positions.

College career
Marmarinos played college basketball at the University of Nevada, with the Nevada Wolf Pack.

Professional career
Marmarinos won the FIBA Saporta Cup's 2000–01 season championship, while playing with the Greek club Maroussi. In February 2011, he signed with the Greek club Iraklis Thessaloniki. On December 30, 2014, he signed with the Greek 2nd Division club Psychiko.

National team career
Marmarinos played with Greece's under-26 selection at the 2001 Mediterranean Games, where he won a silver medal.

References

External links
Euroleague.net Profile
Eurobasket.com Profile
Italian League Profile 
Greek Basket League Profile 
Hellenic Federation Profile 

1976 births
Living people
Apollon Patras B.C. players
Centers (basketball)
Competitors at the 2001 Mediterranean Games
Esperos B.C. players
Greek men's basketball players
Greek expatriate basketball people in the United States
Maroussi B.C. players
Mediterranean Games medalists in basketball
Mediterranean Games silver medalists for Greece
Nevada Wolf Pack men's basketball players
Pallacanestro Virtus Roma players
Panionios B.C. players
P.A.O.K. BC players
Power forwards (basketball)
Psychiko B.C. players
Trikala B.C. players
Sportspeople from Chalcis